Route 649, or Highway 649, may refer to:

Canada
Alberta Highway 649
 Ontario Highway 649 (Kawartha Lakes Road 49)
Saskatchewan Highway 649

United Kingdom
London Buses route 649

United States